Shurjeh (also Romanized as Shūrjeh; also known as Shūrājān, Shūra Jubbeh, Shūrcheh, and Shūrījeh) is a village in Shurjeh Rural District, in the Central District of Sarvestan County, Fars Province, Ira]. At the 2006 census, its population was 993, in 227 families.

References 

Populated places in Sarvestan County